The Sleeping Cardinal, also known as Sherlock Holmes' Fatal Hour in the United States, is a 1931 British mystery film directed by Leslie S. Hiscott and starring Arthur Wontner and Ian Fleming. The film is an adaptation of the Sherlock Holmes stories by Arthur Conan Doyle, although it is not based on any one particular story it draws inspiration from "The Empty House" and "The Final Problem". 

It as shot at Twickenham Studios in London with sets designed by the art director James A. Carter. The film is the first in the 1931–1937 film series starring Wontner as Sherlock Holmes. It is unrelated to the Basil Rathbone series of Holmes films which began in the late 1930s.

Plot summary
Opening with a silent sequence in silhouette within the Bank of England, we're whisked to a London home where a young diplomatic attache, Foreign Office bureaucrat Ronnie Adair (Leslie Perrins), is once again winning handsomely while gambling at bridge.

Adair is called to a meeting  with "The Sleeping Cardinal", a picture disguising the identity of Professor Moriarty (Norman McKinnel), and blackmailed into taking counterfeit money to Paris in his diplomatic pouch. Adair's concerned sister calls for the assistance of Sherlock Holmes (Arthur Wontner) and Dr. Watson (Ian Fleming) to investigate the reasons for her brother's gambling excesses and depressed moods. After Adair succumbs to an apparent suicide; Holmes deduces Moriarty's involvement from a trail of clues.

Cast
Arthur Wontner as Sherlock Holmes
Ian Fleming as Dr. Watson
Philip Hewland as Inspector Lestrade
Jane Welsh as Kathleen Adair
Norman McKinnel as Prof. Moriarty, alias Col. Henslowe
Minnie Rayner as Mrs. Hudson
Leslie Perrins as Ronald Adair
Gordon Begg as Marston, the butler
William Fazan as Thomas Fisher
Sydney King as Tony Rutherford
Louis Goodrich as Colonel Sebastian Moran
Harry Terry as No. 16
Charles Paton as J.J. Godfrey

Critical reception
Allmovie wrote, "Sherlock Holmes' Fatal Hour got the Wontner Holmes series off to a rousing start."

References

External links 

1931 films
British mystery films
1930s English-language films
British black-and-white films
Films directed by Leslie S. Hiscott
Sherlock Holmes films
1931 mystery films
Films set in London
1930s British films
Films shot at Twickenham Film Studios
Warner Bros. films